Garač (Montenegrin Cyrillic: Гарач) is a mountain in central Montenegro, overlooking the city of Danilovgrad from the southwest. Its highest peak, Milunova bobija, is 1,436 meters high. Despite its relatively small height, its shape and prominence of circa 1400 meters, rising above the Zeta River Valley and Bjelopavlići, earned it the nickname "Montenegrin Kilimanjaro".

It is built of marble, limestone and dolomite, and its steep slopes are subject to erosion. The southern slopes are covered with forest, while the northern slopes are mostly barren.

Peaks
Five highest peaks of Garač are:

 Milunova bobija 
 Kaluđerova bobija  
 Šćepanova bobija 
 Viti krš 
 Uljanik

References

Mountains of Montenegro
Danilovgrad Municipality
Dinaric Alps